Kim Ju-ryong (born 5 June 1961) is a South Korean middle-distance runner. He competed in the men's 3000 metres steeplechase at the 1984 Summer Olympics.

References

1961 births
Living people
Athletes (track and field) at the 1984 Summer Olympics
South Korean male middle-distance runners
South Korean male steeplechase runners
Olympic athletes of South Korea
Place of birth missing (living people)